The United National Heavyweight Championship (often shortened to UN Championship) is a professional wrestling title in the Japanese promotion Pro Wrestling Zero1. It is one of ZERO1's top two singles titles, along with the Zero1 World Heavyweight Championship. The UN title was created on January 31, 2004, when Masato Tanaka defeated Steve Corino in an Indian strap match, wrestling as Masa Tanaka. It was founded at a time when Zero1 was a member of the National Wrestling Alliance; since the two organizations' parting in late 2004, the NWA does not recognize or sanction it, though it retains the NWA initials. There have been a total of 26 recognized champions who have had a combined 32 official reigns. The title was revived by NWA Pro Wrestling in January 2011. NWA began recognizing title and sanctioning title matches in January 2011 after Zero1 was reinstated as a member of NWA. NWA stopped sanctioning the title after Zero1 left the NWA again in 2011.

Title history

Combined reigns

See also
List of National Wrestling Alliance championships
IWGP United States Championship
IWGP Intercontinental Championship
PWF World Asia Heavyweight Championship
PWF Gaora Television Heavyweight Championship
GHC National Championship

References

External links
ZEROONEUSA.com title history
Wrestling-Titles.com title history
TitleHistories.com title history

Pro Wrestling Zero1 championships
Heavyweight wrestling championships
National Wrestling Alliance championships
National professional wrestling championships